= Victorian Polo Club =

Polo club in Richmond, Victoria, Australia

The Victorian Polo Club is a polo club in Richmond, Victoria, Australia. It is the oldest and largest polo club in Victoria.
